Jefferson Davis High School is a public high school with grades 9 through 12 located in Montgomery, Alabama, United States. The principal is Demond Mullins. The school is part of the Montgomery Public Schools system.

History
In 2020, the school district's board of education voted to change the school's name.

Notable alumni
 Craig Brazell, former MLB player (New York Mets, Kansas City Royals)
 Gwendolyn Boyd, former President Alabama State University and Delta Sigma Theta sorority; valedictorian in 1973
 Artur Davis, former Democratic Congressman of Alabama
 Ladarius Gunter, former Carolina Panthers cornerback
 Glenn Howerton, actor, plays Dennis on It's Always Sunny in Philadelphia; graduated in 1994
 Jamey Johnson, country music singer and songwriter
 Robert Johnson, former NFL tight end
 Octavia Spencer, Academy Award-winning actress; appeared in the movie The Help (film); graduated in 1988
 Curtis Stewart, former NFL running back
 George Teague, former NFL free safety
 George Thornton, former NFL player (San Diego Chargers, New York Giants)
 Lou Thornton, former MLB player (Toronto Blue Jays, New York Mets)
Jasmine Walker, American professional basketball player
 Davern Williams, former NFL defensive tackle

Enrollment, demographics
Enrollment for 2007 was 1,508 students; 48 percent was male and 52 percent was female. Ethnicities enrolled at the school were white, black, and Hispanic. African-American enrollment was 94 percent, white enrollment was 2 percent, Hispanic enrollment was 2 percent, and Asian enrollment was 1%.

References

External links
School website

High schools in Montgomery, Alabama
Public high schools in Alabama
Name changes due to the George Floyd protests